The 2021 Pocono Green 225 recycled by J.P. Mascaro & Sons was the 16th race of the 2021 NASCAR Xfinity Series season, and the 6th iteration of the event. The event was held on Sunday, June 27, 2021 in Long Pond, Pennsylvania at Pocono Raceway, a  triangular permanent course. The race took 90 laps to complete. Austin Cindric of Team Penske would win the race, after a scare for Cindric, as Cindric suffered lap traffic during the last laps of the race. Ty Gibbs of Joe Gibbs Racing and Justin Allgaier of JR Motorsports would take the rest of the podium positions, finishing 2nd and 3rd, respectfully.

Background

Entry list

Starting lineup 
The starting lineup was determined by a formula based on the previous race. As a result, Harrison Burton of Joe Gibbs Racing won the pole.

The only driver not to qualify was Timmy Hill of MBM Motorsports.

Race

Race results 
Stage 1 Laps: 20

Stage 2 Laps: 20

Stage 3 Laps: 50

References 

2021 NASCAR Xfinity Series
NASCAR races at Pocono Raceway
Pocono Green 225
Pocono Green 225